Jahanabad is a neighborhood in the Karachi West district of Karachi, Pakistan. It was previously administered as part of the SITE Town borough, which was disbanded in 2011.

Main areas 
Syed Mohallah
 Hasan Oliya Village
 Dehyani Mohalla
 Haroonabad
 Lashari Mohalla
 Magsi Mohalla
 Mianwali Colony
 Unaited Colony

References

External links 
 Karachi website 
 Local Government Sindh

Neighbourhoods of Karachi
SITE Town